Gareth McGlynn (born 29 October 1982 in Inch, Donegal, Ireland) is a retired footballer who played for Derry City.

Career

Ireland 
McGlynn broke into the Derry side at the age of 17. He made his debut in April 2001 in a 1-0 home victory over Kilkenny City with his first goal for the club arriving 10 days later during a 3-3 draw with Shelbourne. That goal made him the 100th player ever to score for Derry in the League of Ireland. His 200th appearance was made during a game with Drogheda United at United Park towards the end of the 2006 season.

An Irish youth international, McGlynn can play on the right or in the centre of midfield. A talented ball player, he has battled his way back into the team and impressed Stephen Kenny sufficiently to warrant a run in the side. In September 2006, two semi-final goals from McGlynn against Limerick helped Derry win 3-0 and thus qualify for the final of the League of Ireland Cup.

Gareth signed for Pat Fenlon's Bohemians in pre-season 2010 and scored his first goal for Bohemians against Drogheda United on 19 March 2010.

In the close season of 2010, McGlynn was linked with a move to his former club Derry City. McGlynn then re-signed for Derry City in January 2011.

Australia 
He left Derry in December 2011 to go to Australia and signed for Stirling Lions in the Football West State League.

America 
After Australia he travelled to New York, making his debut in March 2014 with Lansdowne Bhoys FC. He then went on to win two Cosmopolitan Soccer League titles in 2014 and 2015 with the Bhoys.

Back to Derry City 
In 2016, he once again signed for Derry City on a one-year deal for his 3rd stint with the team.

Honours
Derry City
FAI Cup (2): 2002, 2006
League of Ireland Cup (5): 2005, 2006, 2007, 2008, 2011

Bohemians
Setanta Sports Cup (1): 2010

Lansdowne Bhoys FC
 Cosmopolitan Soccer League (2) 2014, 2015.

References

External links
 Gareth McGlynn Derry City FC player profiles. Retrieved 9 February 2007.
 

1982 births
Living people
Republic of Ireland association footballers
League of Ireland players
Derry City F.C. players
Republic of Ireland under-21 international footballers
Bohemian F.C. players
League of Ireland XI players
Association football midfielders
Lansdowne Yonkers FC players